Deon Carney is a South African rugby union footballer currently playing with the . His usual position is loose forward.

Carney was part of the  youth structures from 2007 to 2009 before heading overseas to New Zealand where he was a member of 's Wider Training Squad for the 2012 ITM Cup although he didn't make any appearances.

He returned to South Africa ahead of the 2012 Vodacom Cup Season and re-joined Griquas.

References

South African rugby union players
Living people
People from Brits, North West
1991 births
Griquas (rugby union) players
Rugby union flankers
Rugby union players from North West (South African province)